This list consists of fictional investigators written specifically for younger readers:

See also
List of fictional detectives found in child and young adult novels at the website Bookworm for Kids

Young adults